Petrus Wilhelmus Catharina "Piet" Akkermans (1942, Oosterhout - 17 June 2002, Bruges) was a Dutch classical scholar and academic administrator.

Akkermans was rector of the Erasmus University in Rotterdam from 1993 to 2001 and rector of the College of Europe for one year, until his death in 2002. He died of a heart attack while in a meeting at the College in Garenmarkt.

Biography 
After graduating from Gymnasium-A at the Onze Lieve Vrouwelyceum in Breda in 1961, Akkermans obtained a doctoral degree in Greek and Latin language and literature at the Catholic University of Nijmegen. He became a teacher of classical languages in Rotterdam and simultaneously studied law at the Erasmus University in Rotterdam. He obtained his doctorate at Utrecht University with the thesis The human right on education and the Dutch Constitution.

Akkermans continued his academic career as professor of public and administrative law at Erasmus University from 1984; then Dean of the Faculty of Law at Erasmus University (1986-1989 and 1991-1993); then Rector of Erasmus University (1993-2001)

Akkermans became rector of the College of Europe in Bruges on July 1, 2001, but died of a heart attack on June 17, 2002.

During the cabinet formations, the Van Kooten and De Bie duo regularly performed a type of 'Professor Dr. P. Akkermans' ("my name has been called"), played by Kees van Kooten. There is no evidence that this type was based on P.W.C. Akkermans, the comedians also strongly denied this.

References
Akkermans at the College of Europe

1942 births
2002 deaths
Dutch classical scholars
Rectors of the College of Europe
Radboud University Nijmegen alumni
Erasmus University Rotterdam alumni
Academic staff of Erasmus University Rotterdam
People from Oosterhout